Noah Grove (born May 1, 1999) is an American ice sled hockey player. He was a member of the gold medal-winning US team in para ice hockey at the 2018 Winter Paralympics. Grove also played amputee football at the 2014 World Cup.

References

External links 
 
 

1999 births
Living people
American amputees
American sledge hockey players
Paralympic sledge hockey players of the United States
Paralympic gold medalists for the United States
Para ice hockey players at the 2018 Winter Paralympics
Para ice hockey players at the 2022 Winter Paralympics
Medalists at the 2018 Winter Paralympics
Medalists at the 2022 Winter Paralympics
Ice hockey people from Maryland
Sportspeople from Frederick, Maryland
Paralympic medalists in sledge hockey
21st-century American people